Berchemia is a genus of plants in the family Rhamnaceae, named after Dutch botanist Berthout van Berchem. They are climbing plants or small to medium-sized trees that occur in Africa, Asia and the Americas.

Selected species

 
Rhamnaceae genera